Established by Swedish magazine QX in 1999, the Gaygalan Awards are an annual event created to hand out prizes for LGBT achievements. In 2004, the gala was broadcast for the first time on Sveriges Television when it was held at Hamburger Börs with Annika Lantz as the host.

1999 Winners 
 QX Honorary Award: Christer Lindarw
 Homo/bi of the Year: Elisabeth Ohlson Wallin
 Hetero of the Year: K. G. Hammar
 Film of the Year: Show Me Love
 Flipp of the Year: EuroPride
 Bar of the Year: Häcktet (Hornsgatan 82, Stockholm)
 Store of the Year: H&M
 Flopp of the Year: Alf Svensson
 Café of the Year: Chokladkoppen (Stortorget, Stockholm)
 DJ of the Year: Christer Broman
 Gay Club of the Year: Propaganda (Mike's, Blekholmsterrassen 15, Stockholm)
 TV Program of the Year: Diggiloo
 Book of the Year: Ecce Homo
 Song of the Year: "Diva" – Dana International

2000 Winners 
 QX Honorary Award: Eva Dahlgren
 Homo/bi of the Year: Jerker Dalman
 Hetero of the Year: Henrik Johnsson
 Film of the Year: All About My Mother
 Flipp of the Year: Stockholm Pride
 Bar of the Year: Side Track (Wollmar Yxkullsgatan 7, Stockholm)
 Store of the Year: Clark's Case
 Flopp of the Year: Ken Ring
 Café of the Year: Chokladkoppen (Stortorget, Stockholm)
 DJ of the Year: Stonebridge
 Gay Club of the Year: Tiptop (Sveavägen 57, Stockholm)
 TV Program of the Year: Expedition: Robinson
 Book of the Year: Bög – så funkar det by Calle Norlén and Jonas Bergstrand
 Song of the Year: "Take Me to Your Heaven" – Charlotte Perrelli
 Restaurant of the Year: Mandus bar och kök (Österlånggatan 7, Stockholm)

2001 Winners 
 QX Honorary Award: Exit
 Homo of the Year: Magnus Carlsson
 Hetero of the Year: Annika Lantz
 Drag of the Year: Björn Kjellman – Once in a Lifetime
 Book of the Year: Paradiset – Liza Marklund
 TV Program of the Year: Nalles show
 Swedish Film of the Year: Once in a Lifetime
 Gay Place of the Year: Mandus
 Store of the Year: Efva Attling
 Gothenburg Prize: Krizz DeeLight

2002 Winners 
 QX Honorary Award: Stig-Åke Petersson
 Homo of the Year: Andreas Lundstedt
 Hetero of the Year: Mona Sahlin
 Drag of the Year: Rickard Engfors
 Gay Place of the Year: Torget
 Restaurant of the Year: Mandus
 Event of the Year: Lena PH on Börsen
 Comeback of the Year: Lena PH
 TV Program of the Year: Queer
 Swedish Song of the Year: "Listen to Your Heartbeat" – Friends
 Book of the Year: Ett UFO gör entré – Jonas Gardell
 Most Enjoyable Evening of the Year: Avslutningsgalan, Stockholm Pride
 Swedish Film of the Year: Sprängaren
 Store of the Year: IKEA
 Advertising of the Year: Stockholm Pride/Ogilvy
 International Film of the Year: Moulin Rouge!
 International Song of the Year: "Can't Get You Out of My Head" – Kylie Minogue
 Gothenburg Prize: Krizz DeeLight
 Öresund Prize:  Missis Green – Carl-Peter Licorish
 Flopp of the Year: Gustav von Essen

2003 Winners 
 QX Honorary Award: Ammi Helmadotter
 Homo of the Year: Mathias Holmgren
 Hetero of the Year: Thomas Bodström
 Drag of the Year: Tollie & Dolores
 Gay Place of the Year: Patricia
 Best Staff of the Year: Mandus
 Café of the Year: Chokladkoppen
 DJ of the Year: Christer Broman
 Best Straight Bar of the Year: Olssons skor
 TV Program of the Year: Fame Factory
 Swedish Song of the Year: "Never Let It Go" – Afro-dite
 Artist of the Year: Ola Salo
 Film of the Year: Lilja 4-ever
 Event of the Year: Kikki, Lotta and Bettan at Rondo
 Advertising of the Year: ICA
 Book of the Year: Queerfeministisk Agenda – Tiina Rosenberg
 International Song of the Year: "All the Things She Said" – t.A.T.u.
 Gothenburg Prize: Cockpit
 Öresund Prize: Oscar Bar Café
 Flopp of the Year: Per Unckel

2004 Winners 
 QX Honorary Award: Jerusalem Open House
 Homo of the Year: Sverker Åström
 Hetero of the Year: Elin Ek
 Drag of the Year: Tiffany Persson
 Gay Place of the Year: Lino
 Best Staff of the Year: Mandus
 Café of the Year: Djurgårdsterrassen
 Artist of the Year: Alcazar
 TV Program of the Year: Fab 5 
 TV Personality of the Year: Lotta Bromé
 Best Straight Spot of the Year: Blue Moon Bar
 Swedish Song of the Year: Not a Sinner nor a Saint – Alcazar
 International Song of the Year: Everyway That I Can – Sertab Erener
 Swedish Film of the Year: Du ska nog se att det går över
 International Film of the Year: The Hours
 BookElin Ek: Smulklubbens skamlösa systrar – Mian Lodalen
 Event of the Year: Alcazar at Pride
 Gothenburg Prize: Zappho Bar
 Öresund Prize: Wonk

2005 Winners 
 QX Honorary Award: Proud parents of homosexual children
 Homo/bi of the Year: Peter Jöback
 Hetero of the Year: Bishop Caroline Krook
 Drag of the Year: After Dark
 Fighter of the Year: Lars Gårdfeldt
 Artist of the Year: Lena Philipsson
 Comeback of the Year: Lena Philipsson
 Book of the Year: Alla vilda – Birgitta Stenberg
 Show of the Year: La Dolce Vita – After Dark
 Swedish Song of the Year: "Min kärlek" – Shirley Clamp
 International Song of the Year: "Toxic" – Britney Spears
 TV Personality of the Year: Lotta Bromé
 TV Program of the Year: L-word
 Film of the Year: As It Is in Heaven
 Café of the Year: Roxy
 Gay Club of the Year: Lino
 Best Staff of the Year: Populära Sibirien
 Gothenburg Prize: Gretas
 Öresund Prize: Wonk

2006 Winners 
 QX Honorary Award: Göran Bratt
 Homo/bi of the Year: Roger Nordin
 Hetero of the Year: Carin Götblad
 Fighter of the Year: Tiina Rosenberg
 Drag of the Year: Hey Baberiba
 Book of the Year: No tears for queers – Johan Hilton
 Show of the Year: Mamma Mia!
 Swedish Song of the Year: "Håll om mig" – Nanne Grönvall
 International Song of the Year: "Hung Up" – Madonna
 Artist of the Year: Bodies Without Organs
 TV Program of the Year: Desperate Housewives
 TV Personality of the Year: Christine Meltzer
 Gay Club of the Year: Club Conneticon
 Café of the Year: Torget
 Film of the Year: Dalecarlians
 I-don't-believe-my-eyes of the Year: Carola's blomattack at Allsång på Skansen
 We Love You of the Year: Mark Levengood
 Öresund Prize: Wonk
 Gothenburg Prize: Cattis på Castro

2007 Winners 
 QX Honorary Award: The organizers of Riga Pride
 Homo/bi of the Year: Cissi Ramsby
 Hetero of the Year: Sissela Kyle
 Keep-up-the-good-work of the Year: Normal förlag
 Drag of the Year: Diamond Dogs
 Gay Club of the Year: Lino
 Café of the Year: Torget
 Fighter of the Year: Kristian Kabelacs
 Artist of the Year: Lisa Miskovsky
 TV Program of the Year: Ugly Betty
 Show/musical of the Year: Cabaret
 Film of the Year: Brokeback Mountain
 Swedish Song of the Year: "Jag ljuger så bra" – Linda Bengtzing
 International Song of the Year: "I Don't Feel Like Dancin'" – Scissor Sisters
 Book of the Year: Komma ut – Anders Öhrman
 Öresund Prize: Regnbågsfestivalen
 Gothenburg Prize: Gretas

2008 Winners 
 QX Honorary Award: Jonas Gardell
 Homo/bi of the Year: Tomas Tobé
 Hetero of the Year: Mona Sahlin
 Fighter of the Year: Elisabeth Ohlson Wallin
 Duo of the Year: Mia & Klara
 Gay Place of the Year: Gossip, Göteborg
 Oh-a-new-place-to-go-to of the Year: Pigalle, Stockholm
 LGBT-fixed-not-for-real of the Year: Kim in Andra Avenyn (played by Jonas Bane)
 Drag of the Year: Diamond Dogs
 Artist of the Year: Måns Zelmerlöw
 Swedish Song of the Year: "Cara Mia" – Måns Zelmerlöw
 Album of the Year: "Människor som du och jag" – Peter Jöback
 TV Program of the Year: Melodifestivalen 2007
 Scene of the Year: Tillfällig gäst i ditt liv – Jonas Gardell
 Film of the Year: The Queen
 Book of the Year: Luftslottet som sprängdes – Stieg Larsson
 Keep-up-the-good-work of the Year: Daniel Larsson and Andreas Christiansson, founders of Club KAK
 International Song of the Year: Grace Kelly – Mika
 Gothenburg Prize: Gossip
 Öresund Prize: Cabaret Moulin

2009 Winners 
 QX Honorary Award: Hatbrottsjouren
 Homo of the Year: Andreas Lundstedt
 Hetero of the Year: Gustaf Skarsgård
 Fighter of the Year: Jan Wisén, Brandförsvaret
 Gay Place of the Year: Gossip (Göteborg)
 Artist of the Year: Amanda Jenssen
 Swedish Song of the Year: "Empty Room" – Sanna Nielsen
 International Song of the Year: "I Kissed a Girl" – Katy Perry
 Breakthrough of the Year: Björn Gustafsson
 Film of the Year: Patrik, Age 1.5
 Scene of the Year: Dina dagar är räknade by Sissela Kyle
 Duo of the Year: Gustaf Skarsgård and Torkel Peterson
 Drag of the Year: Fashion pack
 Blog of the Year: Per-Robins Gaybloggen
 TV Program of the Year: Bonde söker fru
 TV Star of the Year: Björn Gustafsson
 Book of the Year: Mamma, mormor & jag – Kim Kärnfalk
 Keep-up-the-good-work of the Year: Volontärerna at Stockholm Pride
 Gothenburg Prize: Gossip
 Öresund Prize: Copenhagen Gay & Lesbian Film Festival

2010 Winners 
 QX Honorary Award: Cherin and Mohammed from the Sämre än djur documentary
 Homo/bi of the Year: Mariette Hansson
 Hetero of the Year: Noomi Rapace
 Keep-up-the-good-work of the Year: The rainbow project at the maternity care Mama Mia
 Scene of the Year: No tears for queers
 Book of the Year: Halva liv – Mats Strandberg
 TV Program of the Year: Svenska Hollywoodfruar
 TV Star of the Year: Petra Mede
 Drag of the Year: Rolf Lassgård – Edna Turnblad in Hairspray
 Duo of the Year: Christer Lindarw & Babsan
 Årets vi-älskar-dig: Maria Montazami
 Film of the Year: The Girl with the Dragon Tattoo
 Gothenburg Prize: Gretas, Göteborg (nattklubb)
 Öresund Prize: Wonk, Malmö (nattklubb)
 International Song of the Year: "Bad Romance" – Lady Gaga
 Swedish Song of the Year: "Snälla, snälla" – Caroline af Ugglas
 Artist of the Year: Agnes Carlsson
 Gay Place of the Year: Zipper, Stockholm

2011 Winners 
 QX Honorary Award: Joel Burns, American politician
 Homo/bi of the Year: Elisabeth Ohlson Wallin
 Hetero of the Year: Birgitta Ohlsson
 Keep-up-the-good-work of the Year: Markus Gisslén – Bee Bar i Göteborg
 Scene of the Year: Mia Skäringer – Dyngkåt och hur helig som helst
 Book of the Year: Tiger by Mian Lodalen
 TV Program of the Year: Så mycket bättre
 TV Star of the Year: Maria Montazami
 Drag of the Year: Dark Ladies
 Duo of the Year: Prinsessan Victoria and Prins Daniel
 Årets vi-älskar-dig: Maria Montazami
 Film of the Year: Fyra år till
 Gothenburg Prize: HBTQ-festivalen
 Öresund Prize: Wonk
 International Song of the Year: "Telephone" – Lady Gaga & Beyoncé
 Swedish Song of the Year: "Dancing on My Own" – Robyn
 Artist of the Year: Robyn
 Gay Place of the Year: Momma (Stockholm)
 QX Honorary Award: Joel Burns

2012 Winners 
 QX Honorary Award: Expo
 Homo/bi/trans of the Year: Anton Hysén
 Hetero of the Year: David Lazar
 Keep-up-the-good-work of the Year: Ulrika Westerlund, RFSL
 Scene of the Year: "Angels in America" – Stockholm City Theatre
 Book of the Year: "Allt eller inget" – Rickard Engfors 
 TV Program of the Year: Så mycket bättre
 TV Star of the Year: Roy Fares
 Drag of the Year: Diamond Dogs
 Duo of the Year: Judit & Judit – Comhem
 Film of the Year: With Every Heartbeat
 International Song of the Year: "Born This Way" – Lady Gaga 
 Swedish Song of the Year: "My Heart is Refusing Me" – Loreen
 Artist of the Year: Laleh
 Club of the Year: Paradise Sthlm
 Restaurant/bar/café of the Year: Bee Bar
 Party Fixer of the Year: Katja & Gunn

2013 Winners 
 QX Honorary Award: Uganda's LGBTQ activists (prize picked up by Jimmy and Lawrence)
 Homo/bi/trans of the Year: Jonas Gardell
 Hetero of the Year: Soran Ismail
 Keep-up-the-good-work of the Year: Alf Kjeller (for the work with Stockholm Pride)
 Scene of the Year: After Dark
 Book of the Year: "Torka aldrig tårar utan handskar: Kärleken" – Jonas Gardell
 TV Program of the Year: Don't Ever Wipe Tears Without Gloves"
 TV Star of the Year: Simon J Berger – "Torka aldrig Tårar utan handskar"
 Drag of the Year: After Dark
 Duo of the Year: Adam Pålsson and Adam Lundgren (play the main roles in Don't Ever Wipe Tears Without Gloves)
 Film of the Year: Cockpit Song of the Year: "Euphoria" – Loreen 
 Artist of the Year: Darin
 Gay Place of the Year: Bee Bar

 2014 Winners 
 QX Honorary Award: Barbro Westerholm, among other things because she 35 years ago made sure that the National Board of Health and Welfare removed the disease stamp on homosexuals
 Homo/bi/trans of the Year: Nilla Fischer
 Hetero of the Year: Emma Green Tregaro
 Keep-up-the-good-work of the Year: Sean Kelly
 Scene of the Year: Priscilla
 Book of the Year: "Sjukdomen och Döden" – Jonas Gardell
 TV Program of the Year: Eurovision Song Contest 2013
 TV Star of the Year: Gina Dirawi 
 Drag of the Year: Björn Kjellman
 Film of the Year: Blue Is the Warmest Colour Song of the Year: "Wake Me Up" – Avicii 
 International Song of the Year: "Same Love" – Macklemore & Ryan Lewis 
 Artist of the Year: Peter Jöback
 Gay Place of the Year: Kolingsborg, Stockholm

 2015 Winners 
 QX Honorary Award: The eight pride festivals that had their first parade in 2014; Pajala, Lund, Falkenberg, Karlskrona, Hudiksvall, Falun, Sapmi, Skellefteå
 Homo/bi/trans of the Year: Silvana Imam
 Hetero of the Year: Johan Köhler
 Keep-up-the-good-work of the Year: Kiruna IF Hockey
 Scene of the Year: Once in a Lifetime Musical
 Book of the Year: En liten handbok i konsten att bli lesbisk – Mian Lodalen and Matilda Tudor
 TV Program of the Year: Orange Is the New Black
 Drag of the Year: Peter Jöback for the role of Candy Darling in Once in a Lifetime Musical
 Song of the Year: "Freak" – Molly Sandén 
 Artist of the Year: Alcazar
 Club of the Year: Candy, Stockholm
 Restaurant/bar of the Year: Urban Deli Nytorget, Stockholm
 Moment of the Year: Conchita Wurst winning Eurovision Song Contest 2014
 Duo of the Year: Christine Meltzer and Carina Berg

 2016 Winners 
 QX Honorary Award: Rikard Wolff
 Homo/bi/trans of the Year: Rickard Söderberg
 Hetero of the Year: Malena Ernman 
 Book of the Year: Kommer du tycka om mig nu? – Lina Axelsson Kihlblom
 Film of the Year: Holy Mess Club of the Year: King Kong
 Restaurant of the Year: Bee Bar i Göteborg
 Keep-up-the-good-work of the Year: RFSL Newcomers
 Duo of the Year: Anton Lundqvist and Anastasios Soulis
 Drag of the Year: Cabaret Moulin
 TV Star of the Year: Johan Rehborgs's character Morran
 Artist of the Year: Miriam Bryant
 Song of the Year: "Heroes" – Måns Zelmerlöw
 Scene of the Year: Alcazar – Disco Defenders

 2017 Winners 
 Homo/bi of the Year: Oscar Zia
 Trans of the Year: Cameron Jai
 Hetero of the Year: Peter Pettersson
 Keep-up-the-good-work of the Year: GazeNet
 Drag of the Year: After Dark
 Club of the Year: Gretas
 Restaurant/bar of the Year: Bee Bar
 Duo of the Year: Petra Mede and Måns Zelmerlöw
 International TV Program of the Year: Skam
 Swedish TV Program of the Year: Eurovision Song Contest 2016
 Swedish Song of the Year: "Bara få va´mig själv" – Laleh
 International Song of the Year: "Can't Stop the Feeling!" – Justin Timberlake
 Scene of the Year: "This Is It" – After Dark
 Book of the Year: "This Is My Life" –  Christer Lindarw
 Film of the Year: The Danish Girl Moment of the Year: The Sweden-Brazil match in this summer's Olympics
 LGBT-YouTuber of the Year: Tone Sekelius
 Honorary Award of the Year: Posthumously to Christopher Leinonen, one of the 2016 Orlando nightclub shooting victims

 2018 Winners 
 Homo/bi of the Year: Christer Lindarw
 Trans of the Year: Viktoria Harrysson
 Hetero of the Year: Anders Nilsson
 Club of the Year: Backdoor
 Restaurant/bar of the Year: Mälarpaviljongen
 Keep-up-the-good-work of the Year: Martin Kallur
 Swedish Song of the Year: "A Million Years" – Mariette Hansson
 International Song of the Year: "Symphony" – Clean Bandit with Zara Larsson
 Movie of the Year: Moonlight Swedish TV Program of the Year: "Vår tid är nu"
 International TV Program of the Year: Skam
 TV Star of the Year: Petra Mede
 Duo of the Year: Kajsa Bergqvist and Peter Häggström
 Book of the Year: Christer Björkman – "Generalen (bara jag vet vem som vinner)"
 Drag of the Year: Admira Thunderpussy
 Scene of the Year: The Book of Mormon
 Honorary Award of the Year: The Moscow Community Center

 2019 Winners 

 LGBT of the Year: Caroline Farberger
 LGBTQ Friend of the Year: DJ Méndez
 Drag of the Year: Cherry Wilder
 Film of the Year: Bohemian Rhapsody Place of the Year: Secret Garden
 Song of the Year: "Shallow" – Lady Gaga & Bradley Cooper
 Scene of the Year: No More Fucks to Give – Mia Skäringer
 TV Program of the Year: Vår tid är nu Book of the Year: Såna som du ska inte va här – Marika Carlsson
 Everyday Hero of the Year: Jenni Steiner
 Award of the Year: Patrik Hermansson

 2020 Winners 

 Homo/bi/trans/queer of the Year: Tobias Karlsson
 Hetero of the Year: Albin Ekdal
 Drag of the Year: Miss Vanity
 Film of the Year: And Then We Danced Place of the Year: Secret Garden
 Song of the Year: "Det bästa kanske inte hänt än" – Molly Sandén
 Keep-up-the-good-work of the Year: Regnbågsblod
 Best of the Year: Women's Football Bronze
 Scene of the Year: It Takes a Fool to Remain Sane
 TV Program of the Year: Vår tid är nu TV Star of the Year: Marianne Mörck
 Book of the Year: Inte alltid en dans på rosor 2021 Winners 

 LGBTQ of the Year: Darin
 Hetero of the Year: Victoria, Crown Princess of Sweden
 Drag of the Year: Carnita Molida
 Film of the Year: Min pappa Marianne Duo of the Year: Edvin Törnblom and Johanna Nordström
 Place of the Year: Mälarpaviljongen
 Song of the Year: "En säng av rosor" – Darin
 Keep-up-the-good-work of the Year: SHL Pride Week
 Scene of the Year: Fucking Åmål
 TV Program of the Year: Så mycket bättre''
 TV Star of the Year: Benjamin Ingrosso
 Book of the Year: "Lisa & Lilly" by Mian Lodalen
 QX Honorary Award: Jan Hammarlund

2022 Winners 
 LGBTQ of the Year: Tone Sekelius
 Hetero of the Year: Benjamin Ingrosso
 Duo of the Year: Omar Rudberg and Edvin Ryding
 TV Star of the Year: Christer Lindarw
 Drag of the Year: Imaa Queen
 TV Program of the Year: "Young Royals"
 Book of the Year: "Ett lyckligare år" by Jonas Gardell
 Song of the Year: "Don't shut me down" by ABBA
 Film of the Year: "Who the fuck is Bobby?"
 Scene of the Year: Darin Akustiskt
 Keep-up-the-good-work of the year: Lars Gårdfeldt
 Place of the year: Secret Garden

2023 Winners 
 LGBTQ of the Year: 
 Hetero of the Year: Hasret Bozarslan
 Drag of the Year: After Dark
 Place of the year: The Blue Oyster
 Book of the Year: "Bögen är lös" by Edvin Törnblom
 Film of the Year: "Hilma"
 TV Program of the Year: "Young Royals"
 Song of the Year: "Ingen annan rör mig som du" by Molly Hammar
 TV Star of the Year: Edvin Ryding
 Scene of the Year: Club After Dark
 Duo of the Year: Edvin Törnblom and 
 Keep-up-the-good-work of the year: Lady Busty & Miss Shameless
 QX Honorary Award: Mian Lodalen

References

External links
 Official website

Swedish awards
Awards established in 1999
Magazine awards
1999 establishments in Sweden